Charles Dunlap (conceived October 23, 1983) is better known by his stagename Dunlap Exclusive. He is a Grammy, Stellar and 3x Dove award winning music producer from Nashville, Tennessee who has worked with artists such as 2 Chainz, Lloyd, Jim Jones, Trina, Rick Ross and Lecrae.

As a visionary, Dunlap realized he had outgrown his hometown and moved to Atlanta to pursue music. Right off the bat in his profession, he worked with Gorrila Zoe at Block ENT in the Mixtape market. Later he worked with Atlanta Def Jam/DTP recording artist Playaz Circle as well as landing a placement on Tampa's Atlantic/Big Gates artist Plies on his album Goon Affiliated.

Dunlap left Atlanta to work closely with Interscope group I Square, and Dirty Money on their “Last Train To Paris” album in Los Angeles. Returning to Atlanta a little over a year later, he landed a placement on Jim Jones' album “Capo”. From there he went on to working with acts such as Lecrae, TLC, Snoop Dogg and more. 

Dunlap has music in the Film and Television Industry syncing in #1 TV shows such as Keeping Up With The Kardashians, Bad Girls Club , Love and Hip Hop : New York, and the hit Tv Show Mythic Quest. He has worked with Indie films placing 3 songs in the movie titled "Hey Mr.Postman" featuring stars such as Omar Gooding and Anthony Johnson. Dunlap also made a debut alongside Pop Hiphop artist DeAna Fai in her  "Me & Mine" Official Music Video. He has an upcoming release featured in the hit Podcast, and Television Show DeAna Fai presents Kings & Queens of Entertainment as a guest speaker supporting the National Breast Cancer Foundation and the American Stroke Association. 

He currently resides in Los Angeles, CA.

Discography

Studio albums
I Wanna Thank Me    (August 16, 2019) Snoop Dogg
Turn Up Godz  (March 1, 2019) Waka Flocka Flame ft. DJ Whoo Kid
TLC (June 30, 2017) TLC
Minorville ([September 10, 2013) Derek Minor
Heroes for Sale   (April 16, 2013) Andy Mineo 
Gravity (September 4, 2012) Lecrae
Capo (April 5, 2011) Jim Jones 
Formerly Known  (September 9, 2011) Andy Mineo 
Rehab: The Overdose (January 11, 2011) Lecrae
Blacklight (May 31, 2011) Tedashii
Goon Affiliated (June 8, 2010) Plies

Album charts

Snoop Dogg

TLC

Andy Mineo

Lecrae

Jim Jones

Lecrae

Plies

Accolades 

Grammy
GMA Dove Award
Stellar Award

References

American music industry executives
African-American record producers
American hip hop record producers
1983 births
Living people
21st-century African-American people
20th-century African-American people